Dixter Halt was a short-lived halt station on the Kent and East Sussex Railway on an unmade road leading to Great Dixter house near Northiam in East Sussex. Opened in May 1981 it was used for occasional special services to and from Bodiam until the line from Northiam was finally reopened for regular passenger services to Bodiam in 2000.

History 
Dixter Halt was opened before the reopening of the section of the Kent and East Sussex Railway (KESR) between Northiam and Bodiam. It was located at the point where the grounds of Great Dixter house adjoin the line. The station was ceremonially opened on 25 May 1981, the first train to call being hauled by a Peckett 0-4-0T Marcia and composed of a former District Railway coach and an ex-LNWR brake van. These services continued on Bank Holidays and other special occasions until the August Bank Holiday in 1983, the Thameside Area Group of the KESR using the halt for their Steam at Bodiam Events.

Present day 
The halt was demolished during construction work of reopening the line between Northiam and Bodiam. The unmade road and occupation level crossing adjacent to the site are still in use by the local farmer.

References

External links 
 Image of Dixter Halt on FlickR

Disused railway stations in East Sussex
Former Kent and East Sussex Railway stations
Railway stations in Great Britain opened in 1981
Railway stations in Great Britain closed in 1983
Railway stations built for UK heritage railways
Northiam